John Elliot Bradshaw (June 29, 1933 – May 8, 2016) was an American educator, counselor, motivational speaker, and author who hosted a number of PBS television programs on topics such as addiction, recovery, codependency, and spirituality. Bradshaw was active in the self-help movement, and was credited with popularizing such ideas as the "wounded inner child" and the dysfunctional family. In promotional materials, interviews, and reviews of his work, he was often referred to as a theologian.

Bradshaw was the author of six books, several of which held top slots as New York Times bestsellers; his book Homecoming reached No. 1. During the 1980s and 1990s he hosted a number of PBS television broadcasts based on his books. He served on the board of directors of the Palmer Drug Abuse Program and as the national director of the John Bradshaw Center at Ingleside Hospital in Los Angeles, California.

Early life 
Bradshaw was born in Houston, Texas, into a troubled family and was abandoned by an alcoholic father, who himself was also abandoned by his own father. Bradshaw won scholarships to study for the Roman Catholic priesthood. He earned a B.A. degree in Sacred Theology and an M.A. degree in philosophy from the University of Toronto in Canada. He graduated in 1963 and then returned to academia six years later at Rice University in Houston, Texas, for three years of graduate work in psychology and religion. Bradshaw said alcohol addiction and other problems led to his decision to end his plans for the priesthood.

Career 
Throughout the 1970s, John Bradshaw served as a management consultant at Drillco Manufacturing Company and as a leadership trainer at Denka Chemical Company. He was also director of human resources and served on the board of directors of Texas General Oil Company. Bradshaw was the developer and presenter of workshops for forty Fortune 500 companies and thousands of evolved non-profits and for-profit institutions.

Bradshaw was the author of six books, three of which are New York Times Best Sellers. His work sold over 10 million copies and was published in 42 languages. His final book, Post-Romantic Stress Disorder, was published by Health Communications in 2014. In 1999, Bradshaw was nominated by a group of his peers as "One Of The 100 Most Influential Writers On Emotional Health in the 20th Century."  In All About Love, author and academic bell hooks celebrates Bradshaw's 1992 book Creating Love: The Next Great Stage of Growth as one of her favorite books in part because it "valiantly attempts to establish the link between male domination (the institutionalization of patriarchy) and the lack of love of families." Hooks believes that Bradshaw's work was somewhat overlooked during his lifetime because of his rejection of traditional gender norms.

In 1991, Bradshaw won a Daytime Emmy Award for Outstanding Talk Show Host for his series Bradshaw On: Homecoming. He also appeared on Oprah, Geraldo, Sally, Dr. Ruth, Tom Snyder, Donahue, Politically Incorrect, CNN-Talk Back Live, and Sirius Radio.

He presented lectures and workshops for educational, professional and social organizations starting in 1964. He served in various organizations, such as: member of the board of directors and president of the Palmer Drug Abuse Program (1981–88); national director of Life-Plus Co-Dependency Treatment Center (1987–1990); founder and national director of the John Bradshaw Center at Ingleside Hospital in Los Angeles (1991–1997); and member, national board of directors, of The International Montessori Society (1990–2016). He was an honorary lifetime board member of the Council on Alcohol and Drugs in Houston.

Starting in 1999, Bradshaw was  a senior fellow at The Meadows Institute. The Meadows is a multi-disorder inpatient facility in Arizona specializing in the treatment of a range of addictions. The facility's intensive treatment focuses on drug and alcohol addiction, sexual addictions, depression, eating disorders, psychological conditions, affective disorders and compulsive behaviors. It takes a holistic approach to addiction recovery and includes a wide variety of therapeutic approaches, including the Twelve-step program of Alcoholics Anonymous.

Personal life
Bradshaw resided in the Shadyside subdivision of Houston, Texas, with his wife, Karen.

Death
On May 8, 2016, Bradshaw died of heart failure at the age of 82 and left behind his wife and partner of 20 years, Karen Ann Bradshaw, and two children, John Bradshaw, Jr, and Ariel Harper Bradshaw.

Bibliography
Bradshaw On: The Family – 1986

Television
Spotlight: weekly program (host), 1969–1972
The Bradshaw Difference: syndicated talk show produced by MGM Television, 1996
Speaking the Truth in Love: Independent Production 2009

PBS television network
The Eight Stages of Man: eight-part series, 1982
Bradshaw On the Family: ten-part series, 1985
Where Are You Father?: one-hour program, 1986
Healing the Shame that Binds You: one-hour program, 1987
Adult Children Of Dysfunctional Families: two-hour program, 1988
Surviving Divorce: ninety-minute program, 1989  
Bradshaw On Homecoming: ten-part series, 1990
Creating Love: ten-part series, 1992–1993 
Eating Disorders: three-part series, 1994–1995
Bradshaw On: Family Secrets: six-part series, 1995

See also
Self-help

Notes

External links
 
 Curriculum vitae

References 

1933 births
2016 deaths
American motivational speakers
American motivational writers
Television producers from Texas
American self-help writers
American spiritual writers
American television personalities
Male television personalities
Writers from Houston
Rice University alumni
University of Toronto alumni
St. Thomas High School (Houston, Texas) alumni